Covel may refer to:

People
John Covel (1638–1722), Master of Christ's College, Cambridge
Michael Covel, author and film director
Sean Covel (b. 1976), American film producer
Toby Keith, born Toby Keith Covel, (b. 1961), American country musician

Places
United States
Covel, former name of Easton, California

See also
Covell (disambiguation)